FFK may refer to:
 Curaçao Football Federation
 Faye Fang Kaew, a Thai pop trio
 Falköpings FK, a Swedish football club
 Finnmark, a county of Norway
 Football Federation of Kazakhstan
 Football Federation of Kosovo
 Fredrikstad FK, a Norwegian football club